Alfred Léon Gérault (18606 December 1911), known as Gérault-Richard, was a French journalist and socialist politician, born at Bonnétable (in the départment of Sarthe) of a peasant family.

Gérault-Richard began life as a working upholsterer, first at Le Mans, and then at Paris (1880), where his peasant and socialist songs won him fame in the Montmartre quarter. Prosper-Olivier Lissagaray, the communard, offered him a position on La Bataille, and he became a regular contributor to the progressive journals, especially to La Petite République, of which he became editor-in-chief in 1897.

In 1893, he founded Le Chambard, and was imprisoned for a year (1894) for a personal attack upon the president, Jean Casimir-Perier. In January 1895 he was elected to the Chamber of Deputies as a member of the Socialist Party for the 13th arrondissement of Paris. Gérault-Richard was defeated at the elections of 1898 at Paris, but was twice re-elected (1902–1906, 1906–1911) by the colony of Guadeloupe. He died in Fréjus.

Notes

References
French deputies associated with the conflict over Laïcité

French journalists
Socialist Party (France) politicians
1860 births
1911 deaths
French male writers